Aguilas del Desierto (English: Eagles of the Desert) is a volunteer organization in the United States. Co-founded by Ely Ortiz in 2009, its aim is to look for migrants or undocumented Migrant workers who go missing as they cross the Mexico–United States border.

References

2009 establishments in the United States
Organizations established in 2009
Mexico–United States border
Missing people organizations